Percy Humphreys (3 December 1880 – 13 April 1959) was an English international footballer, who played at inside-right, who later became a football manager.

Career

Club career
In the 1907–08 season, Humphreys joined First Second Leicester Fosse but returned to the First Division with Chelsea for the latter part of the season. He remained with Chelsea until December 1909 when he lost his place to Vivian Woodward.

Humphreys swapped places with Woodward moving across London to join Tottenham Hotspur. Humphreys only made 45 league appearances for Spurs, scoring 24 goals, none of which were as vital as the one that he scored against Chelsea in the final match of the 1909–10 season which ensured that Chelsea were relegated instead of Spurs.

In October 1911, he was transferred back to Leicester Fosse where he spent the rest of the season, before dropping out of the league to join Hartlepools United.

International career
Humphreys made one appearance for England, on 4 April 1903, in a 2–1 defeat to Scotland.

Coaching career
Humphreys managed Hartlepools United between 1912 and 1913.

Humphreys then coached Swiss side FC Basel between 1913 and 1914.

He managed Alessandria, in Italy, from 1920 and 1922.

References

External links
Profile at the FA.com

Profile at EnglandFC.com

Sportspeople from Cambridge
English footballers
England international footballers
English Football League players
Southern Football League players
Queens Park Rangers F.C. players
Notts County F.C. players
Leicester City F.C. players
Chelsea F.C. players
Tottenham Hotspur F.C. players
Hartlepool United F.C. players
English football managers
English expatriate football managers
Hartlepool United F.C. managers
FC Basel managers
U.S. Alessandria Calcio 1912 managers
English Football League representative players
1880 births
1959 deaths
Association football inside forwards
English expatriate sportspeople in Italy
Expatriate football managers in Italy
English expatriate sportspeople in Switzerland
Expatriate football managers in Switzerland